Guangzhou Higher Education Mega Center (HEMC), Guangzhou University Town or Guangzhou University City is an area featured by higher education institutions, located on Xiaoguwei Island in Panyu District, Guangzhou, Guangdong Province, China. It was opened in 2004. With an area of approximately 17.9 km2 and 3.53 millions square meters of indoor space, the complex is capable of accommodating 350 to 400 thousand people.

Components 
In phase I of the project, ten local higher education institutions set up new campuses on the Xiaoguwei island with a total capacity of 120,000 students. All except Guangzhou University maintain their old campuses within the city.

Besides ten universities, Guangdong Science Center, a major science center in China, is located in the Higher Education Mega Center on the west end of Xiaoguwei island.

In the phase II, two more universities set up campuses in Xinzao town which is located across the river on a separate site. The twelve institutions are:

Transportation 
The island can be accessed through the toll Nansha Port Expressway, which links the island to Haizhu District to the north and Panyu District to the south. A two-section cross-river tunnel provides alternative free of charge access to the island, linking it to the Luntou area in Haizhu District via the planned Biological Industry Island. In addition, a bridge connects the island to the southeast part of Haizhu district near the Yingzhou Ecological Park.

Two Guangzhou Metro stations are located on the island. The Higher Education Mega Center North Station and South Station of Line 4 provide access to Guangzhou's metro network.

The island is served by a dozen of bus routes, with buses running mainly between the university town and the city center. Generally there are two types of bus service: Regular buses which operating like buses within the city center, making frequent stops and therefore lengthening the trip; and express buses dedicated to serve the university town, mainly run on expressways and makes less stops. Many of these express buses travel between the old and new campuses of the universities. There are also shuttle buses provided by some universities which travel between their own campuses. However, these buses are reserved for the university faculty and staff and can not be used by the public or students. Inside the university town, students and teachers usually walk or cycle to classes, or ride a bus to farther locations like other universities and the shopping malls. The most heavily used bus route is 381, which runs along the middle ring road that connects all ten universities and two metro stations together.

Sporting facilities 
All ten universities built their own sports facilities as part of the campus development, while some shared facilities were constructed by the government. They include the 39,000-capacity "Guangzhou Higher Education Mega Center Central Stadium," typically used for soccer, and other such venues for the 2010 Asian Games.

References

External links 
Guangzhou University City 
Guangdong Science Center 

 
Universities and colleges in Guangzhou
Panyu District